Unhallowed is the debut studio album by American melodic death metal band The Black Dahlia Murder. It was released through Metal Blade Records on June 17, 2003. An enhanced version of the album was released that included photos and info about the band. Metal Blade released a limited edition vinyl version of Unhallowed on August 20, 2013 in honor of the album's tenth anniversary. The band performed the album in its entirety on their spring 2016 tour with Fallujah and Disentomb.

The intro and outro to this record come from the guide Butchering the Human Carcass for Human Consumption by The Church of Euthanasia. The intro is a narration of the section "Gutting" and the outro is from the section titled "Beheading".

The songs "The Blackest Incarnation" and "Closed Casket Requiem" originally appeared on the EP A Cold-Blooded Epitaph and were re-recorded for this album.

Track listing

Personnel
The Black Dahlia Murder
 Trevor Strnad – lead vocals
 Brian Eschbach – rhythm guitar, backing vocals
 John Kempainen – lead guitar
 David Lock – bass
 Cory Grady – drums

Additional
 The Black Dahlia Murder – production
 Mike Hasty – production, engineer
 Ryan "Bart" Williams – engineer
 Jason Clifton – mastering
 Brian Ebert – photography
 Adam Wentworth – artwork (graphic design)
 Jon Zig – artwork (logo)

References

The Black Dahlia Murder (band) albums
2003 debut albums
Metal Blade Records albums